Serhiy Myronovych Kvit (born 26 November 1965), is a Ukrainian literary critic, journalist, educator and social activist. Former champion of Ukraine in fencing (1984).  Serhiy Kvit served as Rector (President) of the National University of Kyiv-Mohyla Academy from 2007 until 2014. He occupied the position of Minister of Education and Science of Ukraine in 2014-2016 when the progressive Laws on Higher Education (2014) and On Science and Research (2015) were adopted. In 2015 Serhiy Kvit signed an agreement that allowed Ukrainian scientists and businesses to fully participate in Horizon 2020 (H2020), the European Union’s flagship research program.

Biography
Serhiy Kvit was born in the Ukrainian city of Uzhhorod, Zakarpattia region. In 1982, Kvit graduated from high school № 17 in Lviv. In 1983–1985, in connection with military service, Serhiy served in the 29th separate sports company of the Prykarpattia Military District, Soviet Army.  

After military service he entered the preparatory department of the Faculty of Journalism of the Taras Shevchenko Kyiv State University, graduating in 1991. At the same time, during his student years, Serhiy Kvit started working as a journalist. In 1990 he became a founding member of the New Literature Association.    

In 1986-1991 he studied at the faculty of journalism at the Taras Shevchenko National University.    

After graduating from the university, in the same year, he began working in the specialty as an editor of the department in the journal "Word and Time", Taras Shevchenko Institute of Literature of the National Academy of Sciences of Ukraine. In 1993, Kvit became the editor-in-chief of the journal Ukrainian Problems, and two years later he became a member of the Mykola Mikhnovsky Scientific Society.       

In 1999, Kvit headed the press and book publishing department of the State Committee for Information Policy, Television and Radio Broadcasting of Ukraine.        

Serhiy Kvit is a prominent commentator on educational and mass media issues. In 2002-07 he was Dean of the National University of Kyiv-Mohyla Academy's social studies faculty. He founded the Kyiv-Mohyla School of Journalism in 2001 and became President of the Media Reform Centre, set up to initiate open debate and promote more transparent media and government. In 2005-2011 he served as chairman of the Consortium of University Autonomy. Dr. Kvit's research focuses on educational and media reforms, mass communications, and philosophical hermeneutics; he has published several books and numerous articles. In the university, in addition to teaching, he also graduated from the Kyiv-Mohyla Business School, in 2004 he passed the module "Strategy in conditions of turbulence", in 2005 "Mastery of human resources management", in 2011 "Adizes Problem Solving", and in 2021 Program “School for Strategy Architects”.

He has a Ph.D. from the Ukrainian Free University in Munich (2001) and also holds a doctorate in philology from the Taras Shevchenko National University (2002). He subsequently held Fulbright scholarships at Ohio University and Stanford University (USA), a Kennan Institute scholarship at the Woodrow Wilson International Centre in Washington DC and a DAAD (German Academic Exchange Service) scholarship at the University of Cologne.

After the Revolution of Dignity he was appointed Minister of Education and Science of Ukraine by the first Yatsenyuk Government on 27 February 2014 and continued to hold the post under the second Yatsenyuk Government. He did not retain his post in the Groysman Government that was installed on 14 April 2016. Serhiy Kvit is a Honoris Causa of Transcarpathian Academy of Arts, Uzhhorod (2017).

On July 1, 2014, the Verkhovna Rada of Ukraine adopted the Law on Higher Education, and on July 31, it was signed by President Petro Poroshenko. Work on it was carried out on the basis of discussion by the public, students, and representatives of more than 30 educational organizations. 

In the October 2014 parliamentary election, Kvit was elected to Ukraine's parliament Verkhovna Rada on the Petro Poroshenko Bloc electoral list (placed 11th on this list). The Verkhovna Rada terminated his powers as a People's Deputy when he was re-appointed to the Cabinet of Ministers of Ukraine on 2 December 2014.

On November 26, 2015, the Verkhovna Rada of Ukraine approved the Law "On Scientific and Scientific-Technical Activity (On Science and Research)  Reform of higher education during the term of Serhiy Kvit was carried out through the implementation of the concept of comprehensive university autonomy. On November 27, 2015, he was awarded among Best Ukraine’s reformers on the 20th anniversary of the Kyiv Post Gala.

In 2019-2021, Serhiy Kvit was the Head of the National Agency for Higher Education Quality Assurance  and a professor of Kyiv-Mohyla School of Journalism.

He again headed the National University of Kyiv-Mohyla Academy in 2022.

The former member of the Ukrainian paramilitary organization the Stepan Bandera All-Ukrainian Organization «Tryzub». Tryzub became the basis for the formation of the right-wing coalition Right Sector, an organization that played a significant role in the 2014 Ukrainian revolution, and Tryzub's leader, Dmytro Yarosh, became the leader of Right Sector. Serhiy Kvit is a friend of Dmytro Yarosh.

Research activities 
Serhiy Kvit's scientific interests, first of all, concern philosophical hermeneutics, mass communications, university management. He is the author of the scientific monograph "Hermeneutics of Style", which was published by the Publishing House "Kyiv-Mohyla Academy" in 2011. ORCID: https://orcid.org/my-orcid?orcid=0000-0002-9690-8827

Selected works

 Kvit, Serhiy (2022). Skeleton Key: How to Understand the Changing World during Ukraine’s War for Independence // Kyiv Security Forum, June 4: https://ksf.openukraine.org/en/news/2420-klyuch-vid-usih-dverej-jak-rozumiti-svit-shho-zminyujetysya-pid-chas-vijni-za-ukrajinsyku-nezalezhnisty
 Kvit, Serhiy (2022). Russia-Ukraine War through the Prism of Mass Communications // StopFake, May 13: https://www.stopfake.org/en/__trashed-14/?
 Kvit, Serhiy (2022). Media, public rhetoric, and culture in the context of Ukraine’s war for independence from Russia // StopFake, Apr. 9: https://www.stopfake.org/en/media-public-rhetoric-and-culture-in-the-context-of-ukraine-s-war-for-independence-from-russia/
 Kvit, Serhiy; Natalia Stukalo, Natalia (2021). FIDES FACIT FIDEM: Dezvoltarea prin comunicare și transparență a unui process de AC fundamentat pe încredere // Quality Assurance Review for Higher Education, Vol. 11, No. 1 – 2, 2021, pp. 39 – 47: https://www.aracis.ro/wp-content/uploads/2022/03/4-Kvit-Stukalo.pdf
 Kvit, Serhiy (2021). The Battle for History and Building of Identity: Fake News confronts Professional News // StopFake.org: https://www.stopfake.org/en/the-battle-for-history-and-building-of-identity-fake-news-confronts-professional-news/
 Kvit, Serhiy (2021). Towards the Freedom-Seeking Mission of the Ukrainian University // Comparative Education Research Centre at the University of Hong Kong: https://cerc.edu.hku.hk/universities-and-intellectuals/1-1/towards-the-freedom-seeking-mission-of-the-ukrainian-university/
 Kvit, Serhiy (2020). Higher Education in Ukraine in the Time of Independence: Between Brownian Motion and Revolutionary Reform // Kyiv-Mohyla Humanities Journal, 7
 Kvit, Serhiy (2020). Implementing Ukrainian Law in Higher Education: Successes and Challenges // The Research Initiative on Democratic Reforms in Ukraine. - Canadian Institute of Ukrainian Studies (compiled by Olenka Bilash). – University of Alberta. - P. 3-16: https://kvit.ukma.edu.ua/wp-content/uploads/2020/07/The-Research-Initiative-on-Democratic-Reforms-in-Ukraine1.pdf
 Kvit, Serhiy (2020). What is the Capitulation Resistance Movement and why does it matter? // Kyiv Post, May, 8: https://www.kyivpost.com/article/opinion/op-ed/serhiy-kvit-what-is-the-capitulation-resistance-movement-and-why-does-it-matter.html
 Kvit, Serhiy (2020). Ukraine has never given up and never will // Kyiv Post, February, 1: https://www.kyivpost.com/article/opinion/op-ed/serhiy-kvit-ukraine-has-never-given-up-and-never-will.html
 Kvit, Serhiy (2019). A perspective on ‘fake news’ // Kyiv Post, October, 26: https://www.kyivpost.com/article/opinion/op-ed/serhiy-kvit-a-perspective-on-fake-news.html 
 Kvit, Serhiy (2019). New accreditation system and why it matters for universities // Kyiv Post, September 13: https://www.kyivpost.com/article/opinion/op-ed/new-accreditation-system-and-why-it-matters-for-universities.html
 Kvit, Serhiy (2019). Ukraine in the struggle for independence in the age of post-truth // Kyiv Post, June 13: https://www.kyivpost.com/article/opinion/op-ed/serhiy-kvit-ukraine-in-the-struggle-for-independence-in-the-age-of-post-truth.html?cn-reloaded=1 
 Kvit, Serhiy (2019). Chairman of the National Agency for Higher Education Quality Assurance, Serhii Kvit on the objectives of the NAHEQA, combating plagiarism and financial autonomy for universities // Opinion. The Way Ukraine Thinks, March 20: https://opinionua.com/en/2019/03/20/serhii-kvit-on-the-objectives-of-the-naheqa/ 
 Kvit, Serhiy (2018). Mass Communications. – Kyiv, PH "Kyiv-Mohyla Academy". – 350 p.: http://kvit.ukma.edu.ua/wp-content/uploads/2019/02/Mass-Communications-2018.pdf 
 Kvit, Serhiy (2018). A roadmap to higher education reform via autonomy // University World News. - 16 March 2018 Issue No:497: http://www.universityworldnews.com/article.php?story=20180316092127837
 Kvit, Serhiy (2017). One Hundred Years of the Ukrainian Liberation Struggle: http://kvit.ukma.edu.ua/wp-content/uploads/2017/07/One-Hundred-Years-of-the-Ukrainian-Liberation-Struggle1.pdf
 Kvit, Serhiy (2017). The reform of Ukrainian universities – main goals and objectives // Kyiv Post, April 7: https://www.kyivpost.com/article/opinion/op-ed/serhiy-kvit-reform-ukrainian-universities-main-goals-objectives.html 
 Kvit, Serhiy (2015). Battlefront of Civilizations: Education in Ukraine. – Kyiv, PH "Kyiv-Mohyla Academy". – 208 p.: http://kvit.ukma.edu.ua/wp-content/uploads/2017/03/The-Battlerfront-of-civilizations-education-in-Ukraine.pdf
 Kvit, Serhiy (2014). The Ideology of the Euromaidan // Social, Health, and Communication Studies Journal Contemporary Ukraine: A case of Euromaidan, Vol. 1(1), November: http://kvit.ukma.edu.ua/wp-content/uploads/2015/01/The-Ideology-of-the-Euromaidan.pdf
 Kvit, Serhiy (2014) Truth: Philosophy in Transit // Kyiv-Mohyla Humanities Journal. – 1: http://kvit.ukma.kiev.ua/wp-content/uploads/2014/08/Truth-Philosophy-in-Transit.pdf
 Kvit, Serhiy (2013). Dmytro Dontsov. Ideological portrait. – Lviv: Galician Publishing Association. – 192 p.: http://kvit.ukma.edu.ua/wp-content/uploads/2013/10/Dmytro-Dontsov.-Ideological-Portrait3.pdf 
 Kvit, Serhiy (2011). The Hermeneutics of Style. – Kyiv, PH "Kyiv-Mohyla Academy". – 125 p.: http://ekmair.ukma.edu.ua/bitstream/handle/123456789/1086/Kvit_Hermeneutics%20of%20Style.pdf;jsessionid=E8A41C0F64096232AE683E1A2A2C3CCF?sequence=1

References 

1965 births
People from Uzhhorod
Living people
Education and science ministers of Ukraine
Ukrainian educational theorists
University of Kyiv, Journalism Institute alumni
Ukrainian Free University alumni
Academic staff of the University of Kyiv, Journalism Institute
Academic staff of the National University of Kyiv-Mohyla Academy
National University of Kyiv-Mohyla Academy presidents
People of the Euromaidan